Llewelyn Wynne-Jones was a Welsh Anglican priest in the first third of the 20th century.

He was born in 1859 and educated at Shrewsbury and Christ Church, Oxford. Ordained in 1886 he began his career with curacies at West Ham and Upper Tooting. From 1896 he was Vicar of St Mark, Wrexham and a year later was appointed Archdeacon of Wrexham. In addition, between 1915 and 1918 he was a temporary Chaplain to the Forces. He became Dean of St Asaph in 1910, holding the post for 17 years. From then he was Dean Emeritus until his death on 23 February 1936.

References

1859 births
People educated at Shrewsbury School
Alumni of Christ Church, Oxford
Archdeacons of Wrexham
Deans of St Asaph
1936 deaths
Welsh military chaplains
World War I chaplains